Transplantation Proceedings is a peer-reviewed medical journal covering the field of organ transplantation. It is the official publication of 27 international societies in this field.

References

External links 
 

Elsevier academic journals
Publications established in 1969
English-language journals
Organ transplantation journals
Academic journals associated with learned and professional societies